Areariki Arthur Cowan "Riki" Cowan  (born 28 December 1963) is a New Zealand rugby league footballer who represented New Zealand and the Cook Islands.

Playing career
Cowan represented Auckland and the New Zealand Māori side before being selected to play for the New Zealand national rugby league team in 1984. He played in six test matches between 1984 and 1985. He toured the United Kingdom in 1983 with the New Zealand Māori side.

In 1986 he represented the Cook Islands at the Pacific Cup.

Cowan later represented the Wellington district and spent the 1992-93 season in England with St. Helens (Heritage No. 1040).

References

External links
Saints Heritage Society profile

1963 births
Auckland rugby league team players
Canterbury rugby league team players
Cook Islands national rugby league team players
Living people
Mount Albert Lions players
New Zealand Māori rugby league players
New Zealand Māori rugby league team players
New Zealand national rugby league team players
New Zealand sportspeople of Cook Island descent
New Zealand rugby league players
Place of birth missing (living people)
Rugby league props
St Helens R.F.C. players
Wellington rugby league team players